The Christian Democratic Party (PDC) was a political party in Brazil founded in 1945. The PDC, a small party supporting traditional Christian values, never achieved electoral success and was banned by the military government in 1965.

The party was re-created following the fall of the military in 1985, and subsequently merged with other parties, including the Democratic Social Party, to form the right-wing Brazilian Progressive Party (PPB) in 1993.

The former president of Brazil Jair Bolsonaro was a member of the party from 1988 to the merging with Democratic Social Party.

References

Christian democratic parties in South America
Conservative parties in Brazil
Political history of Brazil
Defunct political parties in Brazil
Political parties established in 1945
1945 establishments in Brazil
Political parties disestablished in 1965
1965 disestablishments in Brazil